The 1975 season was Molde's 2nd consecutive year in the top flight, and their 4th season in total in the top flight of Norwegian football.

This season, Molde debuted in European competitions. The team qualified for the 1975–76 UEFA Cup through their second-place finish in the 1974 1. divisjon and made their debut in UEFA competitions this season. The first European game was played against Swedish team Öster at home at Molde Stadion on 17 September 1975. Molde won the game 1–0.

Season events

Squad
Source:

Friendlies

Competitions

1. divisjon

Results summary 

Source:

Positions by round

Results

Table

Norwegian Cup

UEFA Cup

First round

Squad statistics

Goal scorers

See also
Molde FK seasons

References

1975
Molde